Geishouse is a commune in the Haut-Rhin department in Grand Est in north-eastern France.

Geography

Climate
Geishouse has a oceanic climate (Köppen climate classification Cfb).

See also
 Communes of the Haut-Rhin département

References

Communes of Haut-Rhin